Susan Jane Tanner (or Sue Jane Tanner) is an English theatre actress, best known for playing the role of Madame Thénardier in the original London cast of Les Misérables and Jellylorum in the original London version of Cats. She reprised her role in the 1998 video version. Tanner also spent a season with the Royal Shakespeare Company, with roles including Audrey in As You Like It and Mrs Peacham in The Beggar's Opera.

She currently lives in Dorset with her husband.

Selected works

Theatre

Films

References

External links
 
 

English musical theatre actresses
Living people
Year of birth missing (living people)
English stage actresses
English sopranos
English women singers